Rósa Áslaug Valdimarsdóttir (born 6 March 1959) is an Icelandic former footballer who was the captain of Iceland's inaugural women's national football team in 1981.

Rósa played for Breiðablik from 1972 to 1983. In 1973, she led all players in the Icelandic championship with 10 goals, including 6 goals in one game. In 1981, she won the ignaural Icelandic Football Cup, scoring 2 goals in Breiðablik's 4-0 win against Valur in the Cup final. She later played for Íþróttabandalag Ísafjarðar and Sindri Höfn which she also coached for several years.

References

External links
 
 Profile on blikar.is

1959 births
Living people
Rosa Aslaug Valdimarsdottir
Rosa Aslaug Valdimarsdottir
Rosa Aslaug Valdimarsdottir
Rosa Aslaug Valdimarsdottir
Rosa Aslaug Valdimarsdottir
Women's association footballers not categorized by position